Salbertrand is a railway station in Salbertrand. The station opened on 16 October 1871. It is located along the Turin-Modane railway. Train services running through the station are operated by Trenitalia.

Train services
The station is served by the following services:

Turin Metropolitan services (SFM3) Bardonecchia - Bussoleno - Turin

References

External links

Railway stations in Piedmont
Railway stations opened in 1871